I Love to Sing is Alma Cogan's first album, released in 1958 on the His Masters Voice an EMI Records label. All the tracks on the album were arranged by Frank Cordell.

The original mono recording has been re-issued on compact disc by EMI Records in 2003, combined with her next album, With You in Mind. All tracks were also included on the EMI Records 4-CD boxset The Girl with a Laugh in Her Voice in 2001.

Track listing
Side one
"I Love to Sing" (Paul Misraki, Michael Carr, Tommie Connor)
"Life Is Just a Bowl of Cherries" (Ray Henderson, Buddy G. DeSylva, Lew Brown)
"They Can't Take That Away from Me" (George Gershwin, Ira Gershwin)
"Taking a Chance on Love" (Vernon Duke, John Latouche, Ted Fetter)
"Ain't We Got Fun" (Richard A. Whiting, Raymond Egan, Gus Kahn)
"You Do Something to Me" (Cole Porter)

Side two
"Today I Love Everybody" (Harold Arlen, Dorothy Fields)
"Cheek to Cheek" (Irving Berlin)
"If This Isn't Love" (Burton Lane, E. Y. Harburg)
"As Time Goes By" (Herman Hupfeld)
"Comes Love" (Sam Stept, Charles Tobias, Lew Brown)
"Blue Skies" (Irving Berlin)

Personnel
Alma Cogan – vocal
Frank Cordell & His Orchestra

References

1958 debut albums
EMI Records albums
Alma Cogan albums
His Master's Voice albums